Melissa Potocka Moon  (born 16 September 1969) is a long-distance runner from Wellington, New Zealand. She is a two time World Mountain Running champion and has won 21 New Zealand athletics titles over her career. In 2001, she was named New Zealand Sportswoman of the Year. In 2008, she was named as one of the JCI Ten Outstanding Young Persons of the World (TOYP).

In 2010, Moon won the women's race up the 86 flights of stairs of the Empire State Building, in a time of 13 minutes and 13 seconds. In the 2021 New Year Honours, Moon was appointed a Member of the New Zealand Order of Merit, for services to athletics and charitable causes.

External links 
 Official website

References

1969 births
Living people
New Zealand mountain runners
Athletes from Wellington City
People educated at Wellington Girls' College
New Zealand female long-distance runners
World Mountain Running Championships winners
Members of the New Zealand Order of Merit